In computer processors the parity flag indicates if the numbers of set bits is odd or even in the binary representation of the result of the last operation. It is normally a single bit in a processor status register.

For example, assume a machine where a set parity flag indicates even parity.  If the result of the last operation were 26 (11010 in binary), the parity flag would be 0 since the number of set bits is odd.   Similarly, if the result were 10 (1010 in binary) then the parity flag would be 1.

x86 processors

In x86 processors, the parity flag reflects the parity only of the least significant byte of the result, and is set if the number of set bits of ones is even (put another way, the parity bit is set if the sum of the bits is even). According to 80386 Intel manual, the parity flag is changed in the x86 processor family by the following instructions: 
 All arithmetic instructions;
 
In conditional jumps, parity flag is used, where e.g. the JP instruction jumps to the given target when the parity flag is set and the JNP instruction jumps if it is not set. The flag may be also read directly with instructions such as PUSHF, which pushes the flags register on the stack.

One common reason to test the parity flag is to check an unrelated x87-FPU flag. The FPU has four condition flags (C0 to C3), but they can not be tested directly, and must instead be first copied to the flags register. When this happens, C0 is placed in the carry flag, C2 in the parity flag and C3 in the zero flag. The C2 flag is set when e.g. incomparable floating point values (NaN or unsupported format) are compared with the FUCOM instructions.

References

See also
 x86 architecture
 x86 assembly language
 x86 Flags Register

Central processing unit